The Ombrone Pistoiese is an Italian river and tributary of the Arno.

References

Rivers of Italy
Rivers of Tuscany